Wyoming Highway 336 (WYO 336) is a  east-west Wyoming State Road located in central Sheridan County that serves Sheridan and areas east thereof.

Route description

Wyoming Highway 336 begins its western end in Sheridan an intersection with the Business routes of I-90/US 14/US 87 (N. Main Street) and the eastern terminus of Wyoming Highway 330 (Fifth Street). Highway 336 proceeds eastward as Fifth Street and has an interchange with exit 23 of Interstate 90, at just under 1 mile, which at this point also carries US 14 and US 87. Past the interstate WYO 336 turns northeasterly and changes names to Wyarno Road for the easterly community it serves. The highway then gently turns southeasterly and reaches the unincorporated community of Wyarno at approximately 10.2 miles. Beyond Wyarno, Highway 336 reaches its eastern end at Sheridan County Route 42 (Ulm Road) at 11.52 miles.

Major intersections

References

External links 

Wyoming State Routes 300-399

Transportation in Sheridan County, Wyoming
336